Muyser may refer to:

 Arnout de Muyser, painter of the second half of the sixteenth century;
 Albert Demuyser (1920–2003), Belgian artist and racehorse owner;
 Guy de Muyser (1926),  marshal of the Honorary Court of the Grand Duke of Luxembourg, honorary ambassador.